In Turkey, a governor (Turkish: Vali) is an official responsible for the implementation of legislation, constitutional and government decisions in individual provinces. There are 81 governors in Turkey, one for each province, appointed ceremonially by the president on the recommendation of the Interior Ministry. Governors are legally required to be politically neutral and have power over public offices within their province, including the provincial police force. They also have a certain role in local government, though mayors and councillors are elected to these roles in local elections. The provincial head of security (the police force) also concurrently serves as deputy governor.

The Kaymakam (roughly translated as 'sub-governor') has similar functions and roles as the governor but operates on a district level.

Governors by province

Appointment
The governor is officially appointed (Turkish: atanma) to his or her role by the president of Turkey. The Ministry of the Interior first presents their candidate for approval to the president. The president then formally appoints the candidate as the governor of a province.

Term limits
There are no set term limits for governors, although they can be removed from their position at the will of the Interior Ministry. Governors can also be moved from province to province, meaning that it is not unusual for governors to be appointed to a province in which they have no prior experience or personal connection.

Functions

Governors are mainly tasked with the implementation of government legislation and decisions, meaning that they are senior members of the civil service.

Ceremonial
During ceremonies or formal national holiday celebrations, the governor of a province serves as the most senior state official during provincial events unless a national state official (such as the president) is in attendance. The governor presides over the celebrations and formally accepts any awards presented during a ceremony.

Civil service
One of the most important functions of a governor is to make sure decisions, constitutional requirements and new legislation are implemented within the province over which they preside. They are also tasked with the implementation of any demands of government ministries. In the event that legislation cannot be directly or practically implemented, the governor is responsible for bringing about the conditions in which new legislation is compatible with their province.

The governor's powers are decided by government legislation and have the right to issue a 'general command' to implement government decisions, legislation and constitutional requirements.

Local government
Governors have the right to both supervise and reorganise local government positions, which include district and metropolitan municipalities as well as municipal and provincial councillors. Although local elections are held every five years to elect mayors and councillors, the governor (who is unelected) has the right to inspect the proceedings of local administrations as well as conduct any reorganisations that may be deemed necessary. Any legislative changes to local government (such as the 2013 local government reorganisation) are also implemented by the governor.

Command over public institutions
The governor has the right to preside over any matters of state that are not already covered by public institutions within a province, or any matters that do not have an assigned public official to deal with them. The governor can also request public institutions or officials to perform tasks that are related to their aims and purpose if a public institution dealing with said tasks is not available in a province.

The governor has the right to appoint and move some public officials from their positions, as well as provide them his or her own personal viewpoint on certain matters. The governor, as mentioned above, can redetermine the remit and the positions of some public officials within a province.

Provincial security
The governor is the highest level of provincial command of both the police forces and the Gendarmerie. The deputy governor concurrently serves as the head of provincial security, who in turn commands both the head of the provincial police force and the head of the provincial Gendarmerie (A colonel). To maintain peace and security, a governor has the right to take certain decisions intended to stop civil disobediences.

Supergovernor 
From July 1987 to 2002 there existed the position of a supergovernor in the OHAL region (Governorship of Region in State of Emergency) with extra powers to resettle whole villages. He supervised the provincial governors of up to 13 provinces mainly populated by Kurds. From 1990 on he was able to coordinate the actions between the provincial governors.

Controversies
Since governors are appointed by the government, there have been concerns over whether governors can truly be neutral. This is because they are appointed by a partisan government. Several politicians that have become government ministers, such as Efkan Ala and Vecdi Gönül, have previously served as governors of multiple provinces. Furthermore, governors have been accused on numerous occasions of acting with bias in favour of the government. İzmir Mayor Aziz Kocaoğlu accused the governor of İzmir of campaigning for the Justice and Development Party during the 2014 local elections. Governors in Hakkari and Denizli were also accused of forcing public employees to attend President Recep Tayyip Erdoğan's controversial 'public opening' rallies before the June 2015 general election. In 2015, the Peoples' Democratic Party issued a manifesto pledge to introduce elections for governors, rather than appointing them through the Interior Ministry.

Central governors
Besides the 81 provincial governors, some governors who have previously served in a province may be reassigned as a 'central governor' (Turkish: Merkez Valisi). This post does not carry with it any active responsibilities and is effectively a means of terminating a governor's term without withdrawing their privileges or suspending their pay (though their wages are reduced in comparison to provincial governors). The 'centre' (merkez) refers to the Ministry of the Interior, where a central governor is given a small office but have no role until they are reassigned to govern a province. Central governors may visit the Interior Ministry whenever they wish. However, central governors may be given special tasks should the Interior Minister deem it necessary. Previously, it was possible for a governor to legal contest their reassignment from a provincial to a central governor in an attempt to remain in an active gubernatorial role, though this privilege has since been removed.

There are currently around 99 central governors, though this number changes frequently along with re-organisation decrees issued by the government.

List of current governors

Recent changes
The government usually appoints or moves serving governors to different positions through cabinet decrees. Notable decrees are listed below.

See also
Kaymakam
President of Turkey
Ministry of the Interior (Turkey)
Provinces of Turkey

References

External links
Official website of the Interior Ministry

Gubernatorial titles
Government occupations
Turkish governmental institutions